Ehrharta is a genus of plants in the grass family.

Most of the species are native to Africa, with a few from Southeast Asia and from various islands in the Atlantic, Pacific, and Indian Oceans.  The genus is also found in Australia, southern Asia, the Mediterranean, and North America. Several including Ehrharta longiflora, Ehrharta calycina and Ehrharta erecta are considered invasive weeds.

Common names for this genus include veldtgrass.

This genus was named for the German botanist Jakob Friedrich Ehrhart, 1742–1795.

Species 

 Ehrharta acuminata (R.Br.) Spreng.  - Australia
 Ehrharta barbinodis Nees - Cape Province
 Ehrharta brevifolia Schrad. - Cape Province, Namibia
 Ehrharta bulbosa Sm. - Cape Province
 Ehrharta calycina Sm. - Cape Province, Namibia, Free State, Lesotho, KwaZulu-Natal; naturalized in Mediterranean, Australia, New Zealand, USA (California, Nevada, Texas)
 Ehrharta capensis Thunb. - Cape Province; naturalized in India
 Ehrharta delicatula Stapf - Cape Province, Namibia
 Ehrharta digyna Thunb. - Cape Province
 Ehrharta diplax F.Muell. - Sulawesi, New Guinea, New Zealand incl Antipodes, Fiji, Society Is 
 Ehrharta distichophylla Labill. - Australia
 Ehrharta dura Nees - Cape Province
 Ehrharta eburnea Gibbs Russ. - Cape Province
 Ehrharta erecta Lam. - from Eritrea + Saudi Arabia to Cape Province; naturalized in scattered locations in Asia, Australia, New Zealand, California
 Ehrharta festucacea Willd. ex Schult. & Schult.f. - Madagascar
 Ehrharta godefroyi C.Cordem. - Réunion
 Ehrharta juncea (R.Br.) Spreng. - Australia
 Ehrharta laevis (R.Br.) Spreng. - Western Australia
 Ehrharta longiflora Sm. - South Africa, Namibia; naturalized in Cape Verde, St. Helena, Canary Islands, Réunion, India, Australia, New Zealand, California
 Ehrharta longifolia Schrad. - Cape Province
 Ehrharta longigluma C.E.Hubb. - South Africa, Lesotho
 Ehrharta melicoides Thunb. - Cape Province
 Ehrharta microlaena Nees - Cape Province
 Ehrharta oreophila (D.I.Morris) L.P.M.Willemse - Tasmania
 Ehrharta ottonis Kuntze ex Nees - Cape Province
 Ehrharta penicillata C.Cordem. - Réunion
 Ehrharta pusilla Nees  - Cape Province, Namibia
 Ehrharta ramosa Thunb. - Cape Province
 Ehrharta rehmannii Stapf - Cape Province
 Ehrharta rupestris Nees - Cape Province
 Ehrharta setacea Nees - Cape Province
 Ehrharta tasmanica (Hook.f.) L.P.M.Willemse  - Tasmania
 Ehrharta thunbergii Gibbs Russ.  - Cape Province, Namibia
 Ehrharta triandra Nees - Cape Province, Namibia
 Ehrharta villosa Schult.f. - Cape Province; naturalised in Australia, New Zealand North Island, Argentina

Formerly included 

Several species now considered better suited to other genera: Brylkinia Leersia Melinis Microlaena Sporobolus Tristachya Zotovia

References

Oryzoideae
Poaceae genera
Grasses of Africa
Grasses of Asia
Grasses of Europe
Grasses of Oceania
Grasses of North America
Grasses of South America
Taxa named by Carl Peter Thunberg